Ptereleotris hanae, commonly known as the blue gudgeon dartfish or blue hana goby, is a species of dartfish native to the western Pacific Ocean. It inhabits burrows made by alpheid shrimp, but unlike the Amblyeleotris gobies who normally associate with these shrimp, this species has no interactions with their shrimp hosts. This species can reach a length of  TL. It can also be found in the aquarium trade.

References

External links
 

hanae
Fish described in 1901
Taxa named by David Starr Jordan